The Composition of Connacht, or Composition of Connaught and Thomond, was a 1585 agreement between, on the one hand, the Gaelic and Gaelicised chiefs of Connacht and Thomond and, on the other hand, the English Dublin Castle administration of the Kingdom of Ireland, which replaced the multiple existing levies with a single tax on land holdings. The Composition was a form of surrender and regrant, a part of the Tudor reconquest of Ireland. The English leaders were Sir John Perrot, as Lord Deputy of Ireland, and Sir Richard Bingham, as Governor of the Presidency of Connacht.

Connacht was made a Presidency in 1569 and divided into counties afterwards, but the county administration did not function efficiently until the Composition. In 1577, Lord Deputy Henry Sidney instigated a first Composition, which collapsed when President Nicholas Malby died. Under the 1585 Composition, the "countries" (cantreds or trícha céts) of the chiefs became baronies of the counties. The counties affected by the composition included Clare, which, under the name Thomond, was part of the Presidency of Connaught from 1569 until about 1600.

Charges
Prior to the composition, a landholder was liable to pay various charges: to the English a cess to cover the cost of the garrisons; and to the Gaelic chief coyne and livery for his private army, and "cuttings" and "coshery" for his household. These were to be replaced with a fixed annual rent of 10 shillings per quarter of inhabited land payable to the Presidency, plus a variable Composition rent payable to the local chief. Some lands, termed "freedoms", were exempt from Composition rent.

Title
The Composition book recorded the names of the holders of many quarters, together with the amount of rent to which they would be liable. Later generations assumed that this amounted to a proof of title to the land for the heirs of those named. This assumption was denied in the 1630s by Thomas Wentworth, 1st Earl of Strafford. Following the Civil wars of the 1640s, land in Connacht was again reassigned as part of the Cromwellian conquest of Ireland.

People
The following people were either members of the Commission, signatories of the composition, or both:

Footnotes

References

Sources
Primary
 
  
 
 

Secondary

Citations

Connacht
Counties of Ireland
1577 in Ireland
1585 in Ireland
Agreements
History of County Clare